Kentucky Route 48 (KY 48) is an  state highway in the U.S. state of Kentucky. KY 48 runs from U.S. Route 31E (US 31E) and U.S. Route 150 (US 150) in Highgrove to US 62 and KY 55 in Bloomfield, passing through the community of Fairfield.

Route description
KY 48 travels southeast from US 31E in Nelson County. After passing through Fairfield, KY 48 begins heading eastward before terminating at US 62 and KY 55 in Bloomfield.

Major intersections

See also

References

0048
Transportation in Nelson County, Kentucky
Transportation in Spencer County, Kentucky